The economy of Portugal is ranked 34th in the World Economic Forum's Global Competitiveness Report for 2019. The great majority of the international trade is done within the European Union (EU), whose countries received 72.8% of the Portuguese exports and were the origin of 76.5% of the Portuguese imports in 2015. Other regional groups that are significant trade partners of Portugal are the NAFTA (6.3% of the exports and 2% of the imports), the PALOP (5.7% of the exports and 2.5% of the imports), the Maghreb (3.7% of the exports and 1.3% of the imports) and the Mercosul (1.4% of the exports and 2.5% of the imports). The Portuguese currency is the euro (€) and the  country has been a part of the Eurozone since its inception. Portugal's central bank is the Banco de Portugal, which forms part of the European System of Central Banks, and the major stock exchange is the Euronext Lisbon, which belongs to the NYSE Euronext, the first global stock exchange.

The Portuguese economy has been steady, expanding continuously since the third quarter of 2014, with a yearly GDP growth of 1.5% registered in the second quarter of 2015. The economy's growth has been accompanied by a continuous fall in the unemployment rate (6.3% in the first quarter of 2019, compared with 13.9% registered in the end of 2014). The government budget deficit has also been reduced from 11.2% of GDP in 2010 to 0.5% in 2018. These rates mark an inversion from the negative trends caused by the impact of the financial crisis of 2007–2008 in the Portuguese economy that made it to shrink for three consecutive years (2011, 2012, and 2013), accompanied by a high increase of the unemployment rate (that achieved a record of 17.7% in early 2013). The crisis has caused a wide range of domestic problems that are specifically related to the levels of public deficit, as well as the excessive debt levels, in the economy. The problems culminated in the confirmation from Portugal to a €78 billion financial bailout from the EU in April 2011, following similar decisions from Greece and the Republic of Ireland. The government that assumed office in June 2011 had to face tough choices in regard to its attempts to stimulate the economy while at the same time seeking to maintain its public deficit around the EU average.

Portugal is home to a number of notable leading companies with worldwide reputations, such as The Navigator Company, a major world player in the international paper market; Sonae Indústria, the largest producer of wood-based panels in the world; Corticeira Amorim, the world leader in cork production; Conservas Ramirez, the oldest canned food producer; Cimpor, one of the world's 10th largest producers of cement; EDP Renováveis, the 3rd largest producer of wind energy in the world; Jerónimo Martins, consumer products manufacturer and retail market leader in Portugal, Poland and Colombia; TAP Air Portugal, highly regarded for its safety record, and one of the leading airlines linking Europe with Africa and Latin America (especially Brazil).

Education in Portugal has been in gradual modernization and relative expansion since the 1960s, achieving recognition for its world-standard practices and trends in the 21st century. According to the Programme for International Student Assessment (PISA) 2015, the average Portuguese 15-year-old student, when rated in terms of reading literacy, mathematics and science knowledge, is placed significantly above the OECD's average. Portugal is home to several world class universities and business schools that have been contributing to the creation of a number of highly renowned international managers and are attracting an increasing number of foreign students. Portugal has the highest emigration rate as a proportion of population in the European Union. More than two million Portuguese people (20% of the population) now live outside the country.

History

Portuguese Colonial Empire 
During the Portuguese Empire period, started in the 15th century, until the Carnation Revolution of 1974, the economy of Portugal was centered in trade and raw materials related activities within its vast colonial possessions, mainly in Asia (spices, silk, dyes, porcelain and gems), Africa (ivory, timber, oil, diamonds and slaves) and South America (sugar cane, dyes, woods, and gold). The country, with a transcontinental empire with plenty of natural resources and vast unexploited areas, was among the most powerful nations in the world.

In 1822, the Portuguese colony of Brazil became an independent country, however, until 1974, Portugal managed to preserve its colonies/overseas territories in Africa, which included Angola and Mozambique, territories that would experience reasonable rates of economic growth until the departure of the Portuguese in 1975.

The economy of Portugal and its overseas territories on the eve of the Carnation Revolution (a military coup on 25 April 1974) was growing well above the European average. Average family purchasing power was rising together with new consumption patterns and trends and this was promoting both investment in new capital equipment and consumption expenditure for durable and nondurable consumer goods. The Estado Novo regime economic policy encouraged and created conditions for the formation of large business conglomerates.

The regime maintained a policy of corporatism that resulted in the placement of a large part of the Portuguese economy in the hands of a number of strong conglomerates, of which, the most important were known as the "seven magnificent". These Portuguese conglomerates had a business model with similarities to South Korean chaebols and Japanese keiretsus and zaibatsus. Among the seven magnificent were the conglomerates founded and held by the families Champalimaud, Mello (CUF group), Amorim and Santos (Jerónimo Martins group).

The CUF (Companhia União Fabril) group was the largest and most diversified of the Portuguese conglomerates. At one point, it became the largest industrial group in the Iberian Peninsula and one of the five largest in Europe. Its core businesses included the cement, chemicals, petrochemicals, agrochemicals, textiles, beer, beverages, metallurgy, naval engineering, electrical engineering, insurance, banking, paper, tourism and mining. Its main business activities and corporate headquarters located in mainland Portugal, but it also included branches, plants and several developing business projects all around the Portuguese overseas territories, especially in Angola and Mozambique.

Other medium-sized family companies specialized in textiles (for instance those located in the city of Covilhã and the northwest), ceramics, porcelain, glass and crystal (like those of Alcobaça, Caldas da Rainha and Marinha Grande), engineered wood (like SONAE near Porto), canned fish (like those of Algarve and the northwest which included one of the oldest canned fish companies in continuous operation in the world), fishing, food and beverage producing, tourism (well established in Estoril/Cascais/Sintra (the Portuguese Riviera) and growing as an international attraction in the Algarve since the 1960s) and in agriculture (like the ones scattered around Ribatejo and Alentejo – known as the breadbasket of Portugal) completed the panorama of the national economy by the early 1970s. In addition, rural areas' populations were committed to agrarianism that was of great importance for a majority of the total population, with many families living exclusively from agriculture or complementing their salaries with farming, husbandry and forestry yields.

Besides that, the overseas territories were also displaying impressive economic growth and development rates from the 1920s onwards. Even during the Portuguese Colonial War (1961–1974), a counterinsurgency war against independentist guerrilla and terrorism, the overseas territories of Angola and Mozambique (Portuguese Overseas Provinces at the time) had continuous economic growth rates and several sectors of its local economies were booming. They were internationally notable centres of production of oil, coffee, cotton, cashew, coconut, timber, minerals (like diamonds), metals (like iron and aluminium), banana, citrus, tea, sisal, beer, cement, fish and other sea products, beef and textiles.

Labour unions were not allowed and a minimum wage policy was not enforced. However, in a context of an expanding economy, bringing better living conditions for the Portuguese population in the 1960s, the outbreak of the colonial wars in Africa set off significant social changes, among them the rapid incorporation of more and more women into the labour market. Marcelo Caetano moved on to foster economic growth and some social improvements, such as the awarding of a monthly pension to rural workers who had never had the chance to pay social security.

The objectives of Caetano's pension reform were threefold: enhancing equity, reducing fiscal and actuarial imbalance, and achieving more efficiency for the economy as a whole, for example, by establishing contributions less distortive to labour markets or by allowing the savings generated by pension funds to increase the investments in the economy.

1974 

The post Carnation Revolution period was characterized by chaos and negative economic growth as industries were nationalised and the negative effects of the decoupling of Portugal from its former colonies were felt. Heavy industry came to an abrupt halt. All sectors of the economy from manufacturing, mining, chemical, defence, finance, agriculture and fishing went into free fall.

Portugal found itself overnight going from the country in Western Europe with the highest growth rate to the lowest – in fact it experienced several years of negative growth. This was amplified by the mass emigration of skilled workers and entrepreneurs due to political intimidation, and the costs of accommodating in Portugal thousands of refugees from the former overseas provinces in Africa – the retornados.

After the Carnation Revolution's turmoil of 1974, the Portuguese economic basis changed deeply. The Portuguese economy had changed significantly by 1973 prior to the leftist military coup, compared with its position in 1961 – total output (GDP at factor cost) had grown by 120 percent in real terms. Clearly, the prerevolutionary period was characterized by robust annual growth rates for GDP (6.9 percent), industrial production (9 percent), private consumption (6.5 percent), and gross fixed capital formation (7.8 percent). After the Carnation Revolution military coup of 1974, by abandoning its moderate-reformist, pro-democracy posture, the Movimento das Forças Armadas leadership set out on a course of sweeping nationalizations and land expropriations during a period known as PREC. Wide powers were handed over to the working class always having the concept of dictatorship of the proletariat in mind. The lasting effects of this hampered Portugal's economic growth and development for years to come.

In 1931, at the initiation of Salazar's more outward-looking economic policy due to the influence of a new generation of technocrats with background in economics and technical-industrial know-how, Portugal's per capita GDP was only 38 percent of the EC-12 average; by the end of the Salazar period, in 1968, it had risen to 48 percent; and in 1973, on the eve of the revolution, Portugal's per capita GDP had reached 56.4 percent of the EC-12 average. In 1975, the year of maximum revolutionary turmoil, Portugal's per capita GDP declined to 52.3 percent of the EC-12 average. Convergence of real GDP growth toward the EC average occurred as a result of Portugal's economic resurgence since 1985. In 1991 Portugal's GDP per capita climbed to 54.9 percent of the EC average, exceeding by a fraction the level attained just during the worst revolutionary period. Portugal overtook Greece in terms of GDP per capita in 1992, but fell again below it in 1993. This situation endured until 2013 when Greece was more hardly hit by economic fallout from debt crisis.

The growth rate of Portuguese merchandise exports during the period 1959 to 1973 was notable – 11 percent per annum. In 1960 the bulk of exports was accounted for by a few products – canned fish, raw and manufactured cork, cotton textiles, and wine. By contrast, in the early 1970s (before the 1974 military coup), Portugal's export list reflected significant product diversification, including both consumer and capital goods. Several branches of Portuguese industry became export-oriented, and in 1973 over one-fifth of Portuguese manufactured output was exported.

There was a 16-percentage-point increase in the participation of the services sector from 39 percent of GDP in 1973 to 55.5 percent in 1990. Most of this growth reflected the exacerbated proliferation of civil service employment and the associated cost of public administration, together with the contribution of tourism services during the 1980s to the detriment of more sustainable and reproductive activities like manufacturing, exporting and technology/capital-intensive industries.

EU membership (1986) 

Membership in the European Communities, achieved in 1986, contributed to stable economic growth and development, largely through increased trade ties and an inflow of funds allocated by the European Union (and before that the European Communities) to improve the country's infrastructure.

Although the occurrence of economic growth and a public debt relatively well-contained as a result of the number of civil servants has been increased from 485,368 in 1988 to 509,732 in 1991, which was a much lower increase than that which will happen in the following years until 2005 marked by irrational and unsustainable State employment, from 1988 to 1993, during the government cabinets led by then Prime Minister Aníbal Cavaco Silva, the Portuguese economy was radically changed. As a result, there was a sharp and rapid decrease in the output of tradable goods and a rise of the importance of the non-tradable goods sector in the Portuguese economy.

After a recession in 1993, the economy grew at an average annual rate of 3.3%, well above EU averages but well behind the growth of the Portuguese economy before the military coup of 1974.

In order to qualify for the Economic and Monetary Union (EMU), Portugal agreed to cut its fiscal deficit and undertake structural reforms. The EMU brought to Portugal exchange rate stability, falling inflation, and falling interest rates. Falling interest rates, in turn, lowered the cost of public debt and helped the country achieve its fiscal targets.

In 1999, it continued to enjoy sturdy economic growth, falling interest rates, and low unemployment. The country qualified for the Economic and Monetary Union of the European Union (EMU) in 1998 and joined with 10 other European countries in launching the euro on 1 January 1999. The three different designs chosen for the national side of the Portuguese euro coins were drawn by the artist Vitor Manuel Fernandes dos Santos. The inspiration came from the three seals of the first king, Dom Afonso Henriques. Portugal's inflation rate for 1999, 2.4%, was comfortably low.

Household debt expanded rapidly. The European Commission, OECD, and others advised the Portuguese Government to exercise more fiscal restraint. Portugal's public deficit exceeded 3% of GNP in 2001, the EU's self-imposed limit, and left the country open to either EU sanctions or tighter financial supervision. The overall rate of growth slowed in late 2001 and into 2002, making fiscal austerity that much more painful to implement.

Portugal made significant progress in raising its standard of living to that of its EU partners. GDP per capita on a purchasing power parity basis rose from 51% of the EU average in 1985 to 78% in early 2002. By 2005 this had dropped to 72% (of the average across all of now 25 EU members, including seven with GDP per capita lower than Portugal) as GDP per capita rose in other EU countries. Unemployment stood at 4.1% at the end of 2001, which was low compared to the EU average.

GDP growth in 2006, at 1.3%, was the lowest not just in the European Union but in all of Europe. In the 2000s, the Czech Republic, Malta and Slovenia overtook Portugal in terms of GDP per capita. From 2010 until 2012, GDP per capita (PPP) in Portugal fell below those of Slovakia (in Europe) and Seychelles (outside Europe). In 2013 it was estimated that the Portuguese GDP per capita will be similar (within minus or plus US$1,000 per capita) of those of Greece, Estonia and Lithuania. The GDP per capita fell from just over 80% of the EU 25 average in 1999 to just over 70% in 2007. This poor performance of the Portuguese economy was explored in April 2007 by The Economist which described Portugal as "a new sick man of Europe".

From 2002 to 2007, the unemployment rate increased 65% (270,500 unemployed citizens in 2002, 448,600 unemployed citizens in 2007). In December 2009, ratings agency Standard and Poor's lowered its long-term credit assessment of Portugal to "negative" from "stable", voicing pessimism on the country's structural weaknesses in the economy and weak competitiveness that would hamper growth and the capacity to strengthen its public finances and reduce debt.

However, the Portuguese subsidiaries of large multinational companies ranked among the most productive in the world, including Siemens Portugal, Volkswagen Autoeuropa, Qimonda Portugal (before the parent company filed for bankruptcy), IKEA, Nestlé Portugal, Microsoft Portugal, Unilever/Jerónimo Martins and Danone Portugal.

Many Portuguese companies have grown and expanded internationally since after 1986. Among the most notable Portugal-based global companies are SONAE, Amorim, Sogrape, EFACEC, Portugal Telecom, Jerónimo Martins, Cimpor, Unicer, Millennium bcp, Lactogal, Sumol + Compal, Delta Cafés, Derovo, Critical Software, Galp Energia, EDP, Grupo José de Mello, Sovena Group, Valouro, Renova, Teixeira Duarte, Soares da Costa, Portucel Soporcel, Simoldes, Iberomoldes, Logoplaste and TAP Portugal

Portuguese financial crisis (2010–2013) 

The Portuguese Financial crisis was a major political and economic crisis, related with the European sovereign debt crisis and its heavy impact in Portugal. The crisis started to be noted in the initial weeks of 2010 and only began to fade away with the start of the Portuguese economic recovery in the late 2013. It was the Portuguese economy's most severe recession since the 1970s.

A report published in January 2011 by the Diário de Notícias, a leading Portuguese newspaper, demonstrated that during the period of the Carnation Revolution, from 1974 to 2010, the Portuguese democratic governments have encouraged over-expenditure and investment bubbles through unclear public-private partnerships. Consequently, numerous ineffective external consultancy/advising committees and firms were funded, and this facilitated considerable slippage in state-managed public works, inflated top management and head officers' bonuses and wages. Additionally, a recruitment policy eventuated that has boosted the number of redundant public servants.

For almost four decades, the nation's economy has also been damaged by risky credit, public debt creation, and mismanaged European structural and cohesion funds. Apparently, Prime Minister Sócrates's cabinet was unable to forecast or prevent the crisis when symptoms first appeared in 2005, and was later incapable of doing anything to ameliorate the situation when the country was on the verge of bankruptcy in 2011. In 2010, acronyms were widely used by international bond analysts, academics, and the international financial press when referring to the underperforming economies of Portugal, Italy, Ireland, Greece and Spain.

Four factors that heavily contributed to the financial crisis were:
 The financial collapse of Banco Português de Negócios (BPN) due to a huge amount of toxic credits conceded by the bank in exchange of promises of illegal gains to the administrators, like corporate positions or the acquisitions of assets previously detained by them. The government nationalized the bank in November 2008 and, according to the BPN Inquiry Commission, until 2012, the nationalization of the bank cost 3405 million Euros to the State. In 2010 alone, the bank had an impact of 1803 million Euros in the public accounts, which was equivalent to 1.2% of the GDP.
 The bankruptcy of the bank "Banco Privado Português" (BPP), which entailed large costs for the State. This bank was dissolved by Banco de Portugal in April 2010. In 2010 alone, the BPP cost 450 million euros to the taxpayers, consisting in guarantees driven by the State in that year.
 The budgetary slippage with the Public–private partnerships (PPPs): between 2008 and 2010 the accounts slipped 560.2 million euros, mainly due to the rents paid to road concessions, to which were paid more 425.5 million euros than it was budgeted. In 2011 the slippage in the rents with the road concessions rose 28% to 197.4 million euros above what was budgeted and rose 42.3% to 266.3 million euros above what had been forecasted for 2010. The State spent a total of 896.6 million euros in rents to the road concessions. The rents paid to the PPPs in the health and rail sectors also slipped considerably.
 The Swaps contracted by State-owned businesses with potential losses higher than 3000 million euros. In 2013, the Portuguese government reserved 898 million euros in the Amending Government Budget to bear the costs of the settlement of these contracts, so those companies can pay the accumulated losses to the financial institutions with which they contracted those swaps. The recipient firms of that support are the Lisbon Metro (548 million euros), the Porto Metro (315 million euros), REFER, whose administrator in the time when those contracts were approved is the former Finance Minister of Portugal, Maria Luís Albuquerque (20 million euros) and Estradas de Portugal (15 million euros).

In April 2011, Portugal confirmed the receipt of a financial bailout from the IMF and the European Union worth €78 billion ($115 billion, £70 billion), following Greece and the Republic of Ireland. Some senior German policymakers publicly stated that emergency bailouts for Greece and future EU aid recipients should be accompanied by harsh penalties, which caused social unrest in Ireland and across Southern European countries, germanophobia, a big increase of euroscepticism and the rise of far-left and far-right parties in Greece (namely SYRIZA, Golden Dawn, among others), as well as the eurosceptic Five Star Movement and Lega Nord in Italy.

In May 2007, 65% of the Portuguese tended to trust the EU institutions while 24% tended not to trust them. On the other hand, in November 2012, only 34% tended to trust them, while 59% tended not to trust them (even so, less extreme than Greece or Spain, where 81% and 72% tended not to trust them, respectively). Partly as a result of this disappointed attitude concerning the EU, Portugal has started to close ties with Africa, Brazil as well as with other Latin American countries, China, USA, Switzerland and other parts of the world, which has been reflected both in the investments, in foreign trade, and even in emigration.

The three-year EU aid program incorporating the €78 billion support package ended in May 2014. At the time the Portuguese government reaffirmed its commitment to continue its economic reform, declaring that while the bailout had allowed the country to put its economy back on track, it still faced significant challenges.

Resumption of Portuguese economic growth (2014–present) 
The year of 2014 marked the start of the recovery of the Portuguese economy. Since the third quarter of 2014, the Portuguese economy has been steadily expanding, with a GDP growth of 0.4% quarterly and 1.5% yearly registered in the second quarter of 2015. The economic recovery has been accompanied by a continuous fall in the unemployment rate (8.5% in the third quarter of 2017, from a high of 17% in 2012). The Government budget deficit has also been reduced from the 11.2% of GDP in 2010 to 4.8% in 2014.

The International Monetary Fund issued an update report in late June 2017 with some positive news including a stronger near-term outlook and an increase in investments and exports. Because of a surplus in 2016, the country was no longer bound by the Excessive Deficit Procedure. The banking system was more stable, although there were still non-performing loans and corporate debt. The IMF recommended working on solving these problems for Portugal to be able to attract more private investment. "Sustained strong growth, together with continued public debt reduction, would reduce vulnerabilities arising from high indebtedness, particularly when monetary accommodation is reduced."

Data 
GDP growth %

GDP per capita (in US$ PPP)

The following table shows the main economic indicators in 1980–2021 (with IMF staff estimates in 2022–2027). Inflation below 5% is in green.

Government sector

Government expenditure by function 
According to Eurostat in 2011, the General Government expenditure by main function, as a percentage of Total Expenditure, was as follows (compared to the Eurozone and EU averages):

Also according to Eurostat in 2011, the General Government expenditure by three of the main functions, as a percentage of GDP, was as follows (compared to the Eurozone and EU averages):

According to these data, in 2011, Portugal did not present any overspending neither on the coverage of social risks (social protection and health) and the slightly high spending on education can be related to a lag between the average qualifications of Portuguese and their European counterparts, resulting in an eventual attempt to overcome that lag. There has been some remarkable progress towards that objective, since the school dropout rate fell from 43.6% in 2000 to 23.2% in 2011, being this still the 3rd highest in the EU, where the average was 13.5% in the same year.

The functions where the overspending probably existed were in "general public services", specifically those related with compensations to employees, intermediate and final consumptions of the "legislative and executive organs, financial and fiscal affairs and external affairs", some sub-functions in the item "economic affairs", since there was a very intensive public works, notably focused on new motorways, that didn't have a high multiplier effect. It is also worthy to mention the item "public order and safety" and "defence", with the compensations to employees and intermediate and final consumptions being quite higher than the EU average. There seems to have been an overspending on these functions, since Portugal has had only a very discrete role in international conflicts and the crime rate is also quite moderate. There was a big controversy about the purchase of two submarines, whose need has been questioned. Also the expenses in the sub-section of "outpatient services", belonging to the "health" function" was very high compared to the EU average, in opposition to the in-patient "hospital services" where the expenses were very low in 2011. It is also very relevant to explain the difficulties in controlling the deficits if we take into account the payments of interests concerning to loans contracted by the State. Having been stable around 3.0% of the GDP until 2010, they jumped to 4.2% in 2011.

Evolution of the number of public employees in Portugal (1968–2022) 

 All data refer to 31 December of the respective year, except 1996 (which refer to 1 October).
 Data for 1986, 1988 and 1991 were obtained by estimates from internal surveys and exclude military and militarized personnel and public employees in the Azores and Madeira islands.
 Data for 2010 is an estimate made in October 2010 for the State Budget 2011.

In 2019, 13.7% of the employment as a percentage of the labour force worked in the General Government, as opposed to an average of 17.9% in the OECD.

Employment and wages
In the first quarter of 2022, the unemployment rate was at 5.9%.

The unemployment rate has been continuously falling since the end of 2013, marking the reversal of the increase of unemployed people trend that had been recorded since the 2000s. This negative trend had been pronounced with the impact of the financial crisis of 2007–2008, causing the unemployment rate to climb, achieving a record of 17.7% in the early 2013.

The decrease of the unemployment is related with the expanding of the Portuguese Economy registered since the third quarter of 2014 (after shrinking in 2011, 2012 and 2013), with a yearly GDP growth of 1.5% registered in the second quarter of 2015. The increase of the number of people that emigrated to work in other countries also impacted positively the reduction of the unemployment, this happening specially in 2013, when the labor force decreased 1.6% in the first 9 months of the year. Other factors have also impacted the decrease, like the methodology used by the Statistics Portugal (for instance, people doing internships or professional training do not count as unemployed), the previous heavy loss of jobs, the increase of tourism and the resurgence of the agricultural sector, where many jobs were created.

Although being both a developed country and a high income country, Portugal has the lowest GDP per capita in Western Europe and according to the Eurostat it had the 9th lowest purchasing power among the 27 member states of the European Union in 2018.

Maria da Conceição Cerdeira, one of the authors of a published research study made by the Lisbon School of Economics and Management (ISEG), explained that "in a generic way, there is not a high intensity of work, or a great psychological pressure" in Portugal, for the mass of common ordinary workers, unlike what happens in Northern Europe or North America. Less pressure does not mean, however, a better job. The last European survey of workers, published in 2007 and which formed the basis of this 2009 research study showed that Portugal is the 5th European country with lower quality of work. A study conducted by Harvard Business School, including 9 EU member-countries, also revealed that Portugal had the 2nd worst managers in that universe, just above Greece, and below Ireland, Poland, Italy, UK, France, Germany and Sweden.

The first quarter of 2013 marked a new unemployment rate record for Portugal, as it reached 17.8 per cent—up from 16.9 per cent in the previous quarter—and the government predicted an 18.5 per cent unemployment rate in 2014.

Since 2011, the year when Troika arrived to Portugal to apply the bailout program, around 300,000-360,000 people have left the country, many of them qualified young people.

In 2014, unemployment was at 13.9%. Around 70,000 jobs were created while 59,000 people became unavailable to work either due to not finding employment for a long time or emigration. The number of part-time employees who are considered under-employed and as such, would like to work more hours per day, is at 251,700 people while 240,300 people are currently inactive (not working, or studying). The Portuguese Central Bank has stated that one third of jobs created are intern-ships by the IEFP public institute.

Wages
The minimum monthly wage in Portugal is 760 euros (from January 1, 2023), having been previously set at 665 euros. This minimum wage was established in January 2021, having previously been raised from 580 euros in 2018. The minimum wage has been increasing since 2015, where it stood at 505 euros. The average gross wage is 1018 euros (US$1378, nearly the same as Poland and Croatia), and the average net wage is 805 euros (US$1090). All wages are paid 14 times a year, twelve monthly salary payments plus one month's pay in the form of a Christmas bonus and one month for a holiday bonus.

Graduate unemployment
In 2008, about 8% of the people with a degree were unemployed, and a much larger proportion was underemployed. This was directly correlated with a general lack of employability and a student's under-preparation for the workplace that was seen among many courses in a number of fields that were offered by certain higher education institutions or departments. The implementation of the Bologna process and other educational reforms, such as the compulsory closing of a number of courses, departments, colleges and private universities after 2005 due to a lack of academic rigour and low teaching standards, was a completely new approach to tackle the problem.

In 2007 some major private universities were investigated by state agencies and two were immediately closed. Additionally, a number of degrees of the public system were also discontinued due to lack of quality, low demand from potential students or scarce interest from potential employers in these fields. Secondary and post-secondary non-higher education (intermediate education—ensino médio) that consists of technical and vocational education has been redeveloped since 2007 through the governmental policies of the XVII Governo Constitucional (headed by Prime-Minister José Sócrates).

As of March 2014, the graduate unemployment (between 15 and 24 years old) rate is over 35.4%, which represents an increase when comparing to January and February 2014. 57% of the Portuguese youth are planning to emigrate to other countries due to the current (and seemingly the future) fragile state of the economy.

Poverty prevention
History

Poverty and inequality are significant social problems that Portugal has attempted to address through various social policy measures. The European economic crisis has increased the number of households that remain below the poverty line in Portugal with the greatest affected being the youth due to high unemployment rates. The current economic crisis experienced across the globe is the leading cause of income inequalities which lead to poor market demand in an economy and lower economic growth in Portugal. The minimum wage policy is aimed at reducing abject poverty and income inequalities in Portugal which will increase demand and lead to economic stability in the long-term. In 2014 after a four-year freeze Portugal increased their minimum wage by 4%. The minimum wage policy which came after negotiations with labor organizations and employers was only possible after substantial recovery of the economy and will increase the sustainability of the economy with aims at reducing poverty.

Taxes and transfer payments in Portugal

Portugal uses tax and transfer payments to increase equality between high-income earners and the low-income earners in the country. There are significant progressive characteristics of income taxes in Portugal. The government tax policy ensures that the high-income earners face higher taxes in comparison to low-income earners which have enabled the low-income earners to be able to stimulate demand for goods and services in the country economy. The high-income earners pay roughly three times the amount paid by the low-income earners. This approach has been significant in reducing income inequality through means of redistribution.

Portuguese GMI

The Act no. 19-A/96, 29 June created a policy measure by the name of GMI: Guaranteed minimum income. This decade old means tested approach ensures a minimum income which grants financial stability for the citizens of Portugal. The GMI is viewed as a right to the Portuguese people, and proves independent of market influences. The GMI program aims at providing the low-income earners who are above 18 years social and economic autonomy to encourage them to participate in the economic growth of the country. In 2001 reports show that 32 percent of those that were previously approved to benefit from the GMI have been discontinued after attaining an income above the minimum threshold. This report shows GMI policy measures as effective in eradicating poverty and increasing income equality in Portugal

Economy by sector

The tertiary sector is presently the most important component of the Portuguese economy, representing 75.8% of the gross value added (GVA) and employing 68.1% of the working population. It is followed by the industry sector, which represents 21.9% of the GVA, proving 24.5% of the jobs. Fisheries and agriculture – which represented 25% of the economy in 1960 – had a sharp decrease in its weight, now only representing 2.4% of the GVA, while employing 7.5% of the working population.

Natural resources
Forests are the major natural resource of Portugal, covering about 34% of the country. The most important forest resources are the pine trees (13,500 km2), cork oaks (6800 km2), holm oaks (5,340 km2), and eucalyptus (2,430 km2). Cork is a major production, with Portugal producing half of the world's cork. Significant mining resources are lithium, tungsten, tin, and uranium.

Agriculture

After years of decline, the agriculture in Portugal had a surprising resurgence, involuntarily caused by the Portuguese debt crisis, when a number of highly qualified persons lost their jobs in the tertiary sector and decided to turn themselves to the development of agricultural businesses, despite having little or no experience in this sector.

Despite presently representing only a small percentage of the economy, a considerable part of continental Portugal is dedicated to agriculture. The South has developed an extensive monoculture of cereals and olive trees and the Douro Valley of vineyards. Olive trees (4,000 km2; 1,545 sq mi), vineyards (3,750 km2; 1,450 sq mi), wheat (3,000 km2; 1,160 sq mi) and maize (2,680 km2; 1,035 sq mi) are produced in vast areas. Portuguese wine and olive oil are especially praised by nationals for their quality, thus external competition (even at much lower prices) has had little effect on consumer demand.

Portugal is a traditional wine grower, and has exported its wines since the dawn of western civilization; Port Wine, Vinho Verde and Madeira Wine are the leading wine exports. Portugal is also a quality producer of fruits, namely the Algarve oranges, cherries (large production in Cova da Beira and Alto Alentejo), Oeste region's pêra rocha (a type of pear) and Alcobaça’s apples (maçã de Alcobaça). More recently, niche crops such as blueberry and raspberry have seen great increase in production, mainly for exporting. Other exports include horticulture and floriculture products, beet sugar, sunflower oil, cork, and tobacco.

Fisheries

The Portuguese fishing industry is fairly large and diversified. Fishing vessels classified according to the area in which they operate, can be divided into local fishing vessels, coastal fishing vessels and long-distance fishing vessels. The local fleet is mainly composed of small traditional vessels (less than 5 gross tonnage), comprising, in 2004, 87% of the total fishing fleet and accounting for 8% of the total tonnage. These vessels are usually equipped to use more than one fishing method, such as hooks, gill nets and traps, and constitute the so-called polyvalent segment of the fleet.

Their physical output is low but reasonable levels of income are attained by virtue of the high commercial value of the species they capture: octopus, black scabbardfish, conger, pouting, hake and anglerfish. Purse seine fishing is also part of the local fleet and has, on the mainland, only one target species: the sardine. This fishery represents 37% of total landings. Portugal's Exclusive Economic Zone has 1,727,408 km2, being the 3rd largest of the EU and the 20th largest in the world.

The coastal fishing fleet accounted for only 13% of vessels but had the largest GT (93%). These vessels operate in areas farther from the coast, and even outside the Portugal's Exclusive Economic Zone. The coastal fishing fleet comprises polyvalent, purse seine and trawl fishing vessels. The trawlers operate only on the mainland shelf and target demersal species such as horse mackerel, blue whiting, octopus and crustaceans.

The crustacean trawling fishery targets Norway lobster, red shrimp and deepwater rose shrimp. The most important fish species landed in Portugal in 2004 were sardine, mackerel and horse mackerel, representing 37%, 9% and 8% of total landings by weight, and 13%, 1% and 8% of total value, respectively. Molluscs accounted for only 12% of total landings in weight, but 22% of total landings in value. Crustaceans were 0.6% of the total landings by weight and 5% by value.

Industry

The Portuguese industry had a high development, especially after the Second World War, achieving a peak in 1974, when it represented almost 35% of the GDP of Portugal and achieved a high degree of diversification.

Presently, the major industries in Portugal include: machinery, electrical and electronics industries, automotive and shipbuilding industries, injection moulding, plastics and ceramics industries, textile, footwear and leather industries, oil refinery, petrochemistry and cement industries, beverages and food industries and furniture, pulp and paper, wood and cork industries.

Automotive and other mechanical industries such as bicycle industry are primarily located in and around Setúbal, Porto, Lisbon, Aveiro, Braga and Mangualde. Coimbra and Oeiras have growing technological-based industries, including pharmaceuticals and software. Sines has the largest oil refinery in the country and is a major petrochemical centre, as well as the busiest port in Portugal. Maia has one of the largest industrial parks of the country, including noted wood processing and food industries. Figueira da Foz and Setúbal are major centres of pulp and paper industry. Marinha Grande is the most reputed glass making centre of Portugal. Leiria, Oliveira de Azeméis, Vale de Cambra and Viseu, have important light industries, including injection moulding and plastics. Viana do Castelo and Setúbal are centres of ship building and repair industries.

Modern non-traditional technology-based industries like aerospace, biotechnology and information technology, have been developed in several locations across the country. Alverca, Covilhã, Évora, and Ponte de Sor are the main centres of Portuguese aerospace industry, which is led by the local branch of the Brazilian Embraer and by OGMA. Since after the turn of the 21st century, many major biotechnology and information technology industries have been founded and are concentrated in the metropolitan areas of Lisbon, Porto, Braga, Coimbra and Aveiro.

Energy

Since the late 1990s, when wind power was virtually nonexistent in Portugal, the country has become the 6th producer of this kind of renewable energy. Along with the traditional Hydroelectric energy, the Portuguese companies, including the biggest one in the country – EDP – and with the support of the government have heavily invested in new kinds of renewable energy, from then on. In 2010, 52% of the energy produced in Portugal was renewable.

In 2013, 61.7% of the energy produced was renewable, including 30.4% hydroelectric, 24.1% from wind, 5.2% from biomass, 0.9% solar energy and 1.1% from other renewable energy sources, particularly geothermical energy in the Azores. Thanks to this energetic strategy, during 2013 Portugal had reduced to only 5% the energy that it imports. Fossil fuels are still the source of 38.3% or the energy produced, but the trend is to diminish. In 2013, the increase in the production of clean energy helped to save 806 million Euros in the imports of fossil fuels and CO2 emission licenses.

In May 2016, Portugal became the second country in the world to be able to have all its energy consumption fully covered by renewable energy alone, for four consecutive days.

In the 1970s, the country abandoned the plan to install nuclear plants and opted not to invest in nuclear power, so there are no such plants in Portugal.

Services

The tertiary sector has grown, producing 74.4% of the GDP and providing jobs for 65.9% of the working population. The most significant growth rates are found in the trade sector, due to the introduction of modern means of distribution, transport and telecommunications. Financial tertiary companies have benefited from privatisation, also gaining in terms of efficiency.

Tourism in Portugal has developed significantly, generating 17.3% of GDP in 2017 and forecasted to reach 20.5% of GDP in 2018. In 2017, the number of foreign tourists jumped 12 percent to 12.7 million. Including domestic tourists, the total is about 21 million.

Some large Portuguese companies in the services' sector have committed themselves to internationalize their services, like the retailer Jerónimo Martins, which holds the largest supermarket chain in Poland and is also investing in Colombia. Worth to notice is also TAP Portugal, a company often used by transit passengers traveling between Europe, Africa and Latin America (mainly Brazil), which is particularly regarded by its safety record.

Financial market

In the Portuguese financial market, the major stock exchange is the Euronext Lisbon which is part of the NYSE Euronext, the first global stock exchange. It is supervised and regulated by the Portuguese Securities Market Commission. The PSI-20 is Portugal's most selective and widely known stock index. Portugal's central bank is the Banco de Portugal, which is an integral part of the European System of Central Banks. The largest Portuguese banks are Banco Comercial Português and the state-owned Caixa Geral de Depósitos.

Portuguese banks hold strategic stakes in other sectors of the economy, including the insurance sector. Foreign bank participation is relatively high as is state ownership through the Caixa Geral de Depósitos (CGD). Overall, Portugal's financial system is sound, well managed and competitive, with shorter-term risks and vulnerabilities quite well contained, and with the system buttressed by a strong financial policy framework. Despite being relatively small and concentrated, Portugal's banking system generally compares well with other European Union (EU) countries in terms of efficiency, profitability, and asset quality, with solvency also close to European levels.

Across all the financial sub-sectors, and with particular reference to the larger institutions, supervision of Portuguese financial institutions is active, professional and well organized. The insurance sector has performed well, partly reflecting a rapid deepening of the market in Portugal. While sensitive to various types of market and underwriting risks, both the life and non-life sectors, overall, are estimated to be able to withstand a number of severe shocks, even though the impact on individual insurers varies widely.

Competitiveness

Portugal's competitiveness in the world
The Global Competitiveness Report for 2014–2015, published by the World Economic Forum, placed Portugal on the 36th position on the economic index. This represents a sharp increase from the 51st position where Portugal appeared in 2013–2014.

Competitiveness by city
A study concerning competitiveness of the 18 Portuguese district capitals, complying with World Economic Forum methodology, was made by Minho University economics researchers. It was published in Público newspaper on 30 September 2006. The best-ranked cities in the study were Évora, Lisbon and Coimbra.

Ranking:

 Évora: 7,293
 Lisbon: 6,454
 Coimbra: 6,042
 Beja: 5,660
 Leiria: 5,609
 Castelo Branco: 5,608
 Aveiro: 5,452
 Guarda: 5,178
 Santarém: 5,037
 Portalegre: 4,711
 Viseu: 4,628
 Vila Real: 5,514
 Bragança: 4,271
 Setúbal: 4,070
 Braga: 4,055
 Faro: 3,971
 Viana do Castelo: 3,859
 Porto: 3,577

Domestic issues
Forest fires: Like in other countries with very hot summers and seasonal drying of soils and vegetation, every year large areas of the Portuguese forest are destroyed. This has an important impact on the economy because many people and industries depend on forestry related activities. It is also a very dramatic ecological problem and a safety issue for the populations.
Portugal's public debt: The Portuguese national debt is around 125% of the GDP as of June 2017. This problem is a threat to the Portuguese economy and the State's financial sustainability.
A bloated public sector: The public sector has been generally considered a very large, expensive and inefficient part of the economy. An excess of public employees and useless bureaucracy results in the loss of millions of euros every year. From the XVI Governo Constitucional government, headed by Prime Minister José Durão Barroso, to the XVII Governo Constitucional government, headed by Prime Minister José Sócrates (which tried to create new rules and implement reforms aiming at better efficiency, rationalized resource allocation, fight civil servant excedentary overcapacity (excedentários) and less bureaucracy for both citizens and companies – e.g.: empresa na hora , PRACE – Programa de Reestruturação da Administração Central do Estado, and SIMPLEX – Programa de Simplificação Administrativa e Legislativa, among others), the "public expenditure problem" has been a major concern in Portugal, however it had little effect, and the country's public debt and deficit were both out of control by 2010. In addition, João Bilhim who directed in 2005 the committee responsible for the Programme for Restructuring the State's Central Administration (PRACE) said to be disappointed with the results of the reforms tried in the mid-2000s.
Corruption: According to the 2008 Corruption Perceptions Index of countries published by Transparency International, Portugal had the 32nd lowest level of corruption out of 180 countries. In 2012 it had slumped to a three-way tie for 33rd place. (By comparison, in the same years, the United States ranked 18th and 19th). Nevertheless, corruption has become an issue of major political and economic significance for the Portuguese. The responsible authorities and many civic associations and think tanks are trying to combat corruption before it increases further. Many abusive lobbies and corruption schemes are related to concessions, unclear approvals to contractors and economic groups, or job creation for and commercial agreements with friends and family members, mainly involving the huge public sector and companies. Some cases are well known and were widely reported in the media, such as the affairs in several municipalities involving local town hall officials and businesspersons, as well as a number of politicians with wider responsibilities and power. Notable criminal cases include the Face Oculta, the Oeiras Municipality Mayor Isaltino Morais scandal, the Apito Dourado and the Saco Azul de Felgueiras.

Education, training and research in business and economic sciences

There are many higher education institutions awarding academic degrees in economics and business management, spread across the whole country. Programmes in management and administration are offered by almost every Portuguese universities and polytechnics. Programmes in economics are offered by all public and by some private universities.

Among the largest and most reputed universities, which host an economics department and develop research on this area, are the University of Lisbon (through its ISEG - Lisbon School of Economics and Management), the ISCTE – Lisbon University Institute, the Portuguese Catholic University (through their Católica Lisbon School of Business and Economics and Católica Porto School of Economics and Management), the University of Porto (through its Faculdade de Economia); the Universidade Nova de Lisboa (through its NOVA SBE – Nova School of Business and Economics); the Minho University (through its Escola de Economia e Gestão ); and the University of Coimbra (through its Faculdade de Economia ). The Financial Times European Business school ranking has consistently placed the Católica Lisbon School of Business and Economics and the Nova School of Business and Economics among the top European business and economics schools.

Besides the higher education institutions, both the Bank of Portugal and the Statistics Portugal develop lengthy and thoroughly systematic research and make reports on the Portuguese economy.

Poverty
In 2012, 45.4% of the population were at risk of poverty before social transfers, compared to the EU27 average (Croatia not yet included) of 44.1%. When pensions are included the percentage goes down to 25.2%. 17.5% of the population were at risk of poverty after social transfers, meaning their disposable income was below their national at-risk-of-poverty threshold, which is set at 60% of the national median income per adult equivalent. This is just above the European Union average of 17%, and compares favorably to other Southern European countries, such as Spain (22.2%), Italy (19.4%) and Greece (23.1%).

In January 2015, the poverty stats was updated to 2013: 19.5% of the population were at risk of poverty after social transfers, meaning their disposable income was below their national at-risk-of-poverty threshold, which is set at 60% of the national median income per adult equivalent numbering nearly 2 million people. According to ISEG economist, Carlos Farinha Rodrigues Portugal went back 10 years in terms of social reality, having lost all the progress that was made until 2009. The risk of poverty after social transfers for men is 18.9%, 20% for women, 25.6% for children, 38.4% for monoparental families with at least one child, 15.4% for two parents and on child and 28.8% for other aggregates with children (elderly, etc.). The National Statistics Institute made a separate calculation, basing their data in 2009 in order to have a poverty line that doesn't decrease because of the income decreases associated with the crisis: with this calculation, the poverty risk increase is far greater with 17.9% in 2009 to 25.9% 4 years later. The Prime-Minister, Pedro Passos Coelho, has stated that these numbers do not reflect the current situation.

Food Insecurity 
In 2005 and 2006, the National Health Survey gathered information on food security which showed that those making a monthly household income of 251-500 euros made up 37.3% of the food insecure, which was quite contrary to their counterparts. For instance, those making more than a monthly household income of 901 euros made up only 15.9% of the food insecure. After the Portuguese financial crisis that began in 2010, food insecurity escalated and notably affected those in poorer regions in Portugal—such as Alentejo and Algarve. In the Algarve region, total food insecurity increased from 56.9% to 77.1% from 2011 to 2012, and the severe food insecurity increased from 13.2% to 41.7%. Meanwhile, the national food insecurity only increased by 0.5% (48.6% to 49.1%) and the severe food insecurity of other regions, such as Centro and Norte, started much lower and only increase by approximately 3%. Overall, the general prevalence of food insecurity from 2011 to 2013 in Portugal was practically unchanged; however, the less fortunate and poorer regions were seen to have taken the toll, despite future progress.

See also
Government of Portugal
Portuguese national debt
List of taxes in Portugal

References

External links
 OECD's Portugal country Web site
 OECD Economic Survey of Portugal
 World Bank Summary Trade Statistics Portugal
 Tariffs applied by Portugal as provided by ITC's Market Access Map, an online database of customs tariffs and market requirements

 
Portugal
Portugal
Portugal
Portugal